The Port of Hastings Development Authority is an authority of the Government of Victoria, Australia.  The authority is responsible for the development and management of the port of Hastings located in Western Port Bay approximately 72 kilometres to the south east of Melbourne.   The port is expected to be developed by the authority as a major new container port in competition with the Port of Melbourne, Australia's busiest container port.

Establishment of the authority 
The Port of Hastings Development Authority was established under the Transport Integration Act and commenced operation on 1 January 2012.   The Act provides that the object of the agency is to—
 manage and operate the port of Hastings, and
 facilitate the development of the port of Hastings as a viable alternative to the port of Melbourne as a container port in order to increase capacity and competition in the container ports sector to accommodate future growth in trade.

More broadly, the functions of the authority are—
  to plan for the development and operation of the port
  to develop or enable and control the development by others of the whole or any part of the port
  to manage or enable and control the management by others of the whole or any part of the port
  to provide or enable and control the provision by others of, services for the operation of the port
  to promote and market the port
  to facilitate the integration of infrastructure and logistics systems in the port of Hastings with the transport system and other relevant systems outside the port.

Reasons for establishing the authority 
The Port of Hastings Development Authority was established under changes made to the Transport Integration Act, Victoria's central transport statute, by the Transport Legislation Amendment (Port of Hastings Development Authority Act) 2011.  The Minister for Ports, the Hon Denis Napthine MLA introduced the legislation into the Victorian Parliament on 1 June 2011.  He indicated to the Parliament that the Bill for the Act "...sets Melbourne's commercial ports on a path to faster growth through increased capacity and competition in the container ports sector.  The Bill establishes a new independent Port of Hastings Development Authority as a key first step in fast-tracking the development of Hastings as a future container port.  Dr Napthine went on to say that—

The authority will complement the Port of Melbourne Corporation in handling the massive growth in trade in Victoria.  In addition, a separate container port in Hastings will deliver the benefits of greater competition to Victorian exporters and consumers of imported goods.  Increased capacity is needed urgently to cater for the city's rapidly growing container trade, which has a pivotal role in Victoria's and Australia's economy.  The government is acting now to ensure that a container port is developed at Hastings within the next 10 to 13 years.  ...the required expansion in container port capacity will be best achieved by an independent authority which will ultimately complement the Port of Melbourne Corporation in meeting the state's need for increased port capacity."

The port of Melbourne is Australia's largest container port, handling around 37 per cent of all container trade. Strong growth in container trade, coupled with the high proportion of containerised freight transported by road, has significantly increased traffic congestion on the roads used by trucks to access the port of Melbourne.  By 2035 the Port of Melbourne Corporation forecasts that the port will be handling nearly 8 million 20-foot equivalent units of containers -- nearly four times what it is handling today.  This trend has been clear for some years and demands urgent and decisive action.

This Bill lays the policy and organisational foundations to ensure that the deepwater port at Hastings is given an opportunity to reach its full potential as a competitive container port for Victoria and Australia.  The Bill establishes the Port of Hastings Development Authority as a transport corporation under the Transport Integration Act 2010 with the primary object to manage and operate the port of Hastings and facilitate the timely development of the port of Hastings as a viable alternative to the port of Melbourne in order to increase capacity and competition in the container ports sector to manage the expected growth in trade.

The authority's object, functions and powers are consistent with other corporations established under the act. They include a strong, independent board of directors, corporate powers, and annual report and corporate plan requirements.  This charter is similar to the functions and powers of the previous Port of Hastings Corporation but with a clearer object to drive the development of Hastings.

The Port of Hastings Development Authority is established on the same legal basis as the Port of Melbourne Corporation.  Land around the port at Hastings is transferred to the new authority, and responsibility for the port waters at Hastings is returned to the Victorian Regional Channels Authority. This will allow the authority to focus on the land-side development of the port.

Earlier development of Hastings as a container port will alleviate the pressures associated with Melbourne's burgeoning container trade and make a major contribution to state and national economic growth.  It will increase container port capacity, put downward pressure on port charges paid by importers and exporters by increasing competition, minimise future congestion around the port of Melbourne and broaden Victoria's future freight transport options."

Port operations

Day to day management of port and channels 
The Port of Hastings Authority administers a Port Management Agreement (Port of Hastings) for the port.  The agreement provides that day-to-day operation of the port is contracted out by the authority to Patrick Ports Hastings, a division of Asciano Ltd.  Patrick provides management services for the Port of Hastings, including Long Island Point, Crib Point and Stony Point jetties and approaches.  Patrick is required under the terms of the agreement to maintain the condition of the property and infrastructure within the port.  The operation of the channels in Western Port is also the responsibility of Patrick Ports Hastings.   Another Victorian transport agency, the Victorian Reguional Channels Authority, oversees the channel licences for the port.

Current trade 
The Port of Hastings Development Authority reports that around 250 ship visits are recorded each year at the port of Hastings with ships ranging in size up to 165,000 tonnes.  Around 4 million tonnes of petroleum product is handled annually through the port  and around 1.2 million tonnes per annum of steel product.

Environmental considerations 
Western Port is as an area that offers significant environmental values that are recognised worldwide.  The authority has advised that—

"The bay is a listed Ramsar site, part of a Biosphere Reserve, containing three Marine National Parks and five Special Management Areas.  Western Port covers an area of 680sq km and includes two islands, French Island and Phillip Island, which lie at the centre and entrance of the bay respectively. Approximately 40% of Western Port total area is exposed as mud flats at low tide.  The net water flow in Western Port is primarily in a clockwise direction around French Island. The majority of water exchange with Bass Strait is through the western entrance.  Water exchange through the eastern entrance is significantly less, mainly due to the great width of the western entrance.

Freshwater inflow comes via 17 waterways which drain the catchment. The Bunyip, Bass and Lang Lang rivers are the major inflow points which together contribute approximately 75% of the freshwater inflow.  The tidal range (up to three metres) within the bay provides a wide variety of marine habitats ranging from deep channels to very extensive sea grass flats, fringing mangroves and saltmarsh and wide tidal mudflats. This variety of marine habitats provides ideal homes for many different species of animals, birds, sponges and corals."

The environmental values of the area are recognised through the Western Port Ramsar site, specifically its representativeness, flora, fauna and waterbirds.  The site is one of 1675 wetland sites, covering 150 million hectares, designated for inclusion in the Ramsar List of Wetlands of International Importance. These form part of the Ramsar Convention on Wetlands, signed in Ramsar, Iran, in 1971, an intergovernmental treaty which provides the framework for national action and international cooperation for the conservation and appropriate use of wetlands and their resources.

  The Western Port Ramsar site comprises four marine and coastal wetland types recognised under the classification system used by the Ramsar Convention.  These are:
     * marine sub-tidal aquatic beds
     * intertidal mud and sand flats
     * intertidal marshes (including saltmarsh)
     * intertidal forested wetlands (including mangroves."

Controversy over management and development of the port 
The management and development of the port of Hastings has been a controversial State and local issue for some years.

In 2010 before the creation of the Port of Hastings Development Authority, the former Brumby Labor Government conferred responsibility for management and development of the port of Hastings on the Port of Melbourne Corporation at the same time abolishing the former Port of Hastings Corporation, the agency which had previously managed the port for some years.  The "port corporations" at that time - the Port of Melbourne Corporation, the Port of Hastings Corporation and the Victorian Regional Channels Authority  - were originally not included in the Government's Transport Integration Act proposal but were added later to that statute by the Transport Legislation Amendment (Ports Integration) Bill 2010 (the Ports Integration Bill).

The Ports Integration Bill was strongly opposed in the Victorian Parliament by the Liberal and National parties, predominantly on competition grounds, and by the Greens for environmental reasons.  The Bill was defeated in the upper house of the Victorian Parliament, the Legislative Council, but was later passed due to the use of a dispute resolution procedure under the Victorian Constitution.   The Council originally defeated the Bill on 22 June 2010.   However, on 24 June 2010 the Legislative Assembly referred the bill to the Dispute Resolution Committee of the Parliament.   The Assembly returned the bill to the Council for its agreement as recommended by the Dispute Resolution Committee on 27 July 2010.  The Legislative Council ultimately rescinded its resolution defeating the second reading of the Bill and the Bill passed on 12 August 2010.   The Ports Integration Bill merged the Port of Melbourne Corporation and the former Port of Hastings Corporation under a rebadged Port of Melbourne Corporation banner.  The Ports Integration Bill was ultimately proclaimed to commence on 1 September 2010.  This formally brought the Port of Melbourne Corporation and the Victorian Regional Channels Authority within the Transport Integration Act framework on that date.

These developments were, however, largely reversed by the Transport Legislation Amendment (Port of Hastings Development Authority Act) 2011 which created the current Port of Hastings Development Authority and took away the Port of Melbourne Corporation's responsibilities for the port.

The port development remains a controversial issue.  It is supported by the State Government but opposed by many others. A Preserve Western Port Action Group is actively contesting State government claims on economic, social and environmental grounds. Environmental groups are also against the proposed expansion. and the Victorian Greens.

See also 
 Western Port
 Port of Melbourne Corporation
 Patrick Corporation
 Transport Integration Act

References

Organisations based in Melbourne
Economy of Melbourne